The Musical Mojo of Dr. John: Celebrating Mac and His Music is a compilation album by various artists, released by Concord Records on October 21, 2016.

Reception
Hal Horowitz of American Songwriter gave the album a rating of 4.5 out of 5 stars.

References

2016 compilation albums
Concord Records compilation albums